Alexandra Zertsalova (born January 18, 1982) is a Kyrgyz former swimmer, who specialized in individual medley events. Zertsalova competed in a medley double at the 2000 Summer Olympics in Sydney. She achieved FINA B-standards of 2:23.30 (200 m individual medley) and 4:59.24 (400 m individual medley) from the Russian Open Championships in Saint Petersburg. On the first day of the Games, Zertsalova placed twenty-seventh in the 400 m individual medley. Swimming in heat one, she raced to the third seed by more than ten seconds behind Argentina's Georgina Bardach and Slovakia's Jana Korbasová in 5:09.03. Two days later, in the 200 m individual medley, Zertsalova posted a second-place time of 2:24.09 in the same heat, but finished in thirty-second place among 36 other swimmers from the prelims.

References

External links
 

1982 births
Living people
Kyrgyzstani female medley swimmers
Olympic swimmers of Kyrgyzstan
Swimmers at the 2000 Summer Olympics
Sportspeople from Bishkek
Kyrgyzstani people of Russian descent